McCullough Creek is a creek located in the Big Bend Country region of British Columbia.  The creek is a northern tributary of the Goldstream River.  It was discovered in 1864 and mined for gold.  The creek has produced over $750,000 in gold.

References

External links
 

Rivers of British Columbia